The second USS Bancroft (DD-256) was a  in the United States Navy, which briefly served in 1919. Placed in reserve, the ship lay idle before being reactivated for World War II. She was transferred to the Royal Canadian Navy in 1940, where she served as HMCS St. Francis (I93) in the Battle of the Atlantic escorting convoys. The ship was declared surplus in April 1945, sold for scrap and sank on the way to the breakers after a collision in July.

Construction and career

United States Navy service 

Named for George Bancroft, an American historian and diplomat, the destroyer was launched on 21 March 1919 by Bethlehem Shipbuilding Corporation's Fore River Shipyard in Quincy, Massachusetts, sponsored by Miss Mary W. Bancroft, great granddaughter of George Bancroft. The ship was commissioned on 30 June 1919.

Bancroft joined the Atlantic Fleet and took part in fleet training activities until 26 November 1919 when the ship went into reserve commission. The destroyer was placed out of commission at Philadelphia on 11 July 1922. Bancroft was recommissioned 18 December 1939 and served with the Atlantic Squadron on the east coast until decommissioned at Halifax, Nova Scotia. She was then transferred to Great Britain in the destroyer-land bases exchange on 24 September 1940.

Royal Canadian Navy service 

Bancroft was allocated to the Royal Canadian Navy and was taken over by the Canadians on 24 September 1940. Following the Canadian practice of naming destroyers after Canadian rivers (but with deference to the U.S. origin), the destroyer was renamed HMCS St. Francis after the St. Francis River forming the border between northern Maine and Quebec and New Brunswick. St. Francis left Halifax 15 January 1941 and arrived in the River Clyde, Scotland, 26 January. She joined the 4th Escort Group and on 20 May she rescued all the survivors of the steamship Starcrose which had to be sunk after being torpedoed by a submarine. At the end of June she escorted a troop convoy to the Middle East and in July she joined the newly formed Newfoundland Escort Force. Between 1941 and 1943 St. Francis made several attacks on enemy submarines while escorting convoys ON-95, SC-85, ON-105, HX-197, and ON-116 with Mid-Ocean Escort Force group C-4. St. Francis subsequently escorted convoy ON-121 with Escort Group C-3, convoy SC-99 with Escort Group C-1, and convoy ON-147 with Escort Group C-4.

After refitting at Halifax, St. Francis joined Escort Group C2 in the Western Approaches Command in June 1943 but in August was transferred to the 9th Escort Group (RCN), working from Londonderry Port, Northern Ireland. She was reassigned to the Western Local Escort Force at Halifax the following month. From early 1944 she was employed on training duties at Digby, Nova Scotia, where on 1 April 1945 she was declared surplus.

On 14 July 1945, the destroyer was under tow of the tug Peter Norman, and bound for Baltimore to be broken up for scrap by the Boston Iron & Metal Co.. After passing through the Cape Cod Canal, the vessels encountered a thick fog, which enshrouded Buzzards Bay. Near the entrance to the bay the collier Windward Gulf collided with the old destroyer opening a hole in its hull.

Trans-Atlantic convoys escorted

Notes

References

External links
 Navsource

Ships of the Royal Canadian Navy
Clemson-class destroyers
Ships built in Quincy, Massachusetts
1919 ships
Town-class destroyers converted from Clemson-class destroyers
Ships sunk in collisions
Shipwrecks of the Massachusetts coast
World War II shipwrecks in the Atlantic Ocean
Maritime incidents in July 1945